Liolaemus walkeri  is a species of lizard in the family Liolaemidae. The species is endemic to South America.

Etymology
The specific name, walkeri, is in honor of American herpetologist Warren Franklin Walker, Jr. (1918–2013).

Geographic range
L. walkeri is found in Peru.

Habitat

Reproduction
L. walkeri is viviparous.

References

Further reading
Shreve B (1938). "A new Liolaemus and two new Syrrhopus from Peru". Journal of the Washington Academy of Sciences 28 (9): 404–407. (Liolaemus walkeri, new species, pp. 404–406).

walkeri
Lizards of South America
Reptiles of Chile
Reptiles of Peru
Reptiles described in 1938
Taxonomy articles created by Polbot
Taxa named by Benjamin Shreve